Amsterdamsche Hockey & Bandy Club (founded 28 January 1892) is the oldest field hockey club of the Netherlands, based in Amstelveen. AH&BC is also the largest field hockey club in the city (2286 members).

The team is a powerhouse of both domestic and international hockey. Both its men's and women's teams are annual contenders for the Dutch titles. The men's team won its maiden European Cup in 2005.

Originally, the club was also playing bandy, as is still reflected in the club's name.

History
The club was founded in 1892 and is seen as the oldest hockey club of the Netherlands and the European mainland. In the early years bandy was the most important sport, when there was no ice in the summer they would play field hockey. Because of the 1928 Summer Olympics the regard towards hockey changed, the Netherlands national hockey team won the silver medal at the field hockey tournament. From this moment onwards field hockey became the most important sport for the club.

Honours

Men
National Title / Hoofdklasse
 Winners (21): 1924–25, 1925–26, 1926–27, 1927–28, 1928–29, 1931–32, 1932–33, 1933–34, 1936–37, 1961–62, 1963–64, 1964–65, 1965–66, 1974–75, 1993–94, 1994–95, 1996–97, 2002–03, 2003–04, 2010–11, 2011–12
 Runners-up (15): 1905–06, 1906–07, 1908–09, 1916–17, 1973–74, 1982–83, 1983–84, 1988–89, 1997–98, 2001–02, 2005–06, 2007–08, 2008–09, 2015–16, 2017–18
Gold Cup
 Winners (1): 2018–19
KNHB Cup
 Winners (1): 1995–96
 Runners-up (1): 1994–95
Euro Hockey League
 Runners-up (2): 2011–12, 2015–16
European Cup
 Winners (1): 2005
 Runners-up (3): 1995, 1996, 1998
Cup Winners' Cup
 Winners (2): 1999, 2003
Hoofdklasse Indoor
 Winners (10): 1987–88, 1988–89, 2008–09, 2009–10, 2011–12, 2014–15, 2015–16, 2016–17, 2017–18, 2019–20
EuroHockey Indoor Club Cup
Runners-up (1): 1990
EuroHockey Indoor Club Trophy
Winners (1): 2016

Women
National title / Hoofdklasse
 Winners (20): 1936–37, 1937–38, 1948–49, 1970–71, 1971–72, 1973–74, 1974–75, 1975–76, 1978–79, 1979–80, 1980–81, 1982–83, 1983–84, 1986–87, 1988–89, 1990–91, 1991–92, 2008–09, 2012–13, 2018–19
 Hoofdklasse runners-up (18): 1981–82, 1984–85, 1987–88, 1989–90, 1992–93, 1996–97, 1997–98, 1998–99, 1999–00, 2003–04, 2004–05, 2005–06, 2006–07, 2007–08, 2015–16, 2016–17, 2017–18, 2020–21
Euro Hockey League
 Winners (1): 2022
European Cup
 Winners (14): 1975, 1976, 1977, 1978, 1979, 1980, 1981, 1982, 1988, 1989, 1990, 1992, 2014, 2019
 Runners-up (1): 1993
Cup Winners' Cup
 Winners (6): 1998, 1999, 2001, 2005, 2006, 2009
Hoofdklasse Indoor
 Winners (5): 1971–72, 1986–87, 2012–13, 2016–17, 2017–18

Players

Current squad

Women's squad
Head coach: Robert Tigges

Men's squad
Head coach: Alexander Cox

Notable players
 Pol Amat
 Santi Freixa
 Helen van der Ben
 Carina Benninga
 Truid Blaisse-Terwindt
 Jacques Brinkman
 Marten Eikelboom
 Paul van Esseveldt
 Marjolein Eijsvogel
 Floris Evers
 Pierre Hermans
 Taco van den Honert
 Jacob van der Hoeven
 Timme Hoyng
 Bart Looije
 Jesse Mahieu
 Tycho van Meer
 Maartje Scheepstra
 Lisette Sevens
 Clarinda Sinnige
 Taeke Taekema
 Carole Thate
 Klaas Veering
 Sander van der Weide
 Bas Nieuwe Weme
 Valentin Verga
 Cecilia Rognoni

References

External links
Ahbc.nl

 
Dutch field hockey clubs
Bandy clubs in the Netherlands
Bandy clubs established in 1892
Field hockey clubs established in 1892
1892 establishments in the Netherlands
Sports clubs in Amstelveen
Defunct bandy clubs